Jacob Tullin "Tulla" Thams (7 April 1898 – 27 July 1954) was a Norwegian Olympian, who competed in ski jumping and sailing.

Career
He won the first Olympic ski jumping gold medal in 1924, and became the third person (after Gillis Grafström who competed in one sport only and boxer/bobsleigh crew member Eddie Eagan) to medal in both the Winter and Summer Olympics in 1936 as a member of the silver medal-winning Norwegian 8-metre sailing team.

Thams also won the individual large hill at the 1926 FIS Nordic World Ski Championships in Lahti, earned the Holmenkollen medal in 1926 (the first true ski jumper to do so), and would develop the Kongsberger technique in ski jumping (along with fellow Norwegian Sigmund Ruud) that would be the standard until it was superseded by the Daescher technique in the 1950s. Thams is one of the few athletes who have competed in both the Summer and Winter Olympic games.

Ski jumping world records

 Not recognized! Crash at world record distance.

References

External links
 
  
 
 
 

1898 births
1954 deaths
Ski jumpers at the 1924 Winter Olympics
Ski jumpers at the 1928 Winter Olympics
Sailors at the 1936 Summer Olympics – 8 Metre
Holmenkollen medalists
Norwegian male ski jumpers
Olympic ski jumpers of Norway
Norwegian male sailors (sport)
Olympic sailors of Norway
Olympic gold medalists for Norway
Olympic silver medalists for Norway
Olympic medalists in ski jumping
Olympic medalists in sailing
FIS Nordic World Ski Championships medalists in ski jumping
Medalists at the 1924 Winter Olympics
Medalists at the 1936 Summer Olympics
Sportspeople from Oslo